QF-Test from Quality First Software is a cross-platform software tool for the GUI test automation specialized on Java/Swing, SWT, Eclipse plug-ins and RCP applications, Java applets, Java Web Start, ULC and cross-browser test automation of static and dynamic web-based applications (HTML and AJAX frameworks like ExtJS, GWT, GXT, RAP, Qooxdoo, RichFaces, Vaadin, PrimeFaces, ICEfaces and ZK). Version 4.0 added Windows support for the Web browser Chrome, support for JavaFX and the AJAX frameworks jQuery UI and jQueryEasyUI were added.

Testing of PDF documents via record and replay. RESTful web service testing.

Overview 

QF-Test (the successor of qftestJUI, available since 2001) enables regression and load testing and runs on Windows and all major Unix systems. Its commercial application is primarily performed by testers and developers in the field of Quality Assurance. Since December 2008 a webtest add-on is available which allows for test automation of browser-based GUIs (like Internet Explorer and Firefox) in addition to its Java GUI testing functionality which was extended to JavaFX in July 2014.

Features 

QF-Test's capture/replay function enables recording of tests for beginners, while modularization allows for creating large test suites in a concise arrangement. For the advanced user who requires even more control over his application, the tool offers access to internal program structures through the standard scripting languages Jython, the Java implementation of the popular Python language, JavaScript and Groovy.

The tool also offers a batch mode, allowing to run tests unattended and then generate XML, HTML and JUnit reports. Thus the tool can be integrated into existing build/test frameworks like Jenkins, Ant or Maven. Another mode is the so-called Daemon mode for distributed test execution.

A specific integration with many test management tools like HP Quality Center / HP ALM, QMetry, TestLink, SQS-TEST/Professional Suite, Rational Quality Manager, Scapa TPP and Imbus TestBench is available, also some integrated pragmatic small-scale test management (including various reports).

There is a test debugger (enabling arbitrary stepping and editing variables at run time) and a fully automated dependency management that takes care of pre- and postconditions and helps isolating test cases.
Data-driven testing without the need for scripting is possible.

See also
List of GUI testing tools
List of web testing tools
Test automation

External links / References
Quality First Software homepage
 Article "QF-Test Web 3.0 - Stand-alone test" (PDF version) by Tim Kaufmann, in Internet Magazin 2/09, February 2009
 Article "Project-Based Test Automation" (PDF version) by David Harrison, in Testing Experience Magazine 2, June 2009
 

Graphical user interface testing
Software testing tools
Programming tools